L23 may refer to:

Vehicles 
 Beechcraft L-23 Seminole, an American military utility aircraft
 , submarine of the Royal Navy
 , a destroyer of the Royal Navy
 , an amphibious warfare vessel of the Indian Navy
 LET L-23 Super Blaník, a Czechoslovakian glider
 Zeppelin LZ 66, an airship of the Imperial German Navy

Other uses 
 60S ribosomal protein L23
 Mitochondrial ribosomal protein L23
 Nissan L23 engine, an automobile engine
 Pahute Mesa Airstrip (FAA identifier L23)